Geoffrey Joseph Organ (1 May 1918 – 16 April 1993) was an Australian rules footballer who played with Geelong in the Victorian Football League (VFL).

He served in the Australian Army during World War Two.

Notes

External links 

1918 births
1993 deaths
Australian rules footballers from Victoria (Australia)
Geelong Football Club players
Mooroopna Football Club players
Australian military personnel of World War II